Abdallah Sidani (born 1923) is a Lebanese retired wrestler who competed in the 1948 Summer Olympics.

References

External links
 

1923 births
Living people
Place of birth missing (living people)
Lebanese male sport wrestlers
Olympic wrestlers of Lebanon
Wrestlers at the 1948 Summer Olympics